Gainward is a computer hardware company which has produced video cards since 1984. Taiwan-based TNC Industrial sold the company to Palit Microsystems in 2005, acquiring the Gainward brand and branch Gainward Europe GmbH for $1 million.

Product families

Their graphic cards used to be exclusively based on Nvidia chipsets; however, the company also announced ATI-based graphics solutions after the successful launch of ATI 4800-series hardware, although Gainward does not currently produce any cards from the ATI Radeon range.

Gainward traditionally offers overclockable graphic cards that deviate from the reference specifications set forth by Nvidia, such as their Golden Sample range of graphics cards. These cards are overclocked past their stock speeds and tested before they are sold, to ensure quality for customers. Gainward have had success with their Phantom series of graphic cards, featuring removable fans.

References

External links

 

1984 establishments in Taiwan
Electronics companies established in 1984
Graphics hardware companies
Electronics companies of Taiwan
Taiwanese brands
2005 mergers and acquisitions